Legacies is the second volume in a series of Repairman Jack books written by American author F. Paul Wilson. The book was first published in 1998 by Headline in England (February) and by Forge Books in the US (August).

Reception
F&SF reviewer Charles de Lint, noting similarities to the Burke novels of Andrew Vachss, described Legacies as the rare sequel "standing as strong as the original work."

References

American horror novels
1998 American novels
Repairman Jack (series)
Sequel novels
Headline Publishing Group books